Park So-youn (born October 24, 1997) is a retired South Korean figure skater. She is the 2012 Asian Open Figure Skating Trophy champion, the 2014 Asian Open Figure Skating Trophy bronze medalist, the 2015 South Korean national champion, and a three-time South Korean national silver medalist (2012–2014).

On the junior level, she is the 2012 Youth Olympic team event bronze medalist, the 2012 JGP Turkey silver medalist, and the 2011 Asian Open Figure Skating Trophy silver medalist.

She placed 4th at the 2012 Winter Youth Olympics and 21st at the 2014 Winter Olympics.

Career

Early years and junior career
Park began skating when she was eight years old, in the first grade of elementary school. In 2009, she became the youngest Korean national team member, aged 13. She began competing on the ISU Junior Grand Prix series in autumn 2011.

In the 2012–13 season, Park won gold on the senior level at the Asian Trophy and a silver medal at a JGP event in Turkey. She then won her third national silver medal and was sent to her first World Junior Championships, where she placed 12th. In 2013, Park said her goal was to compete at the 2018 Winter Olympics in Pyeongchang.

2013–14 season: Senior international debut
In August, at South Korea Trials for Junior Grand Prix, she placed 1st in the short program and 8th in the free skate, which resulted in 5th place overall. She was not selected to compete at the 2013–14 ISU Junior Grand Prix. She changed her free program for the Korean Nationals. At the 2014 South Korean Championships, she won the silver medal, 49.69 points behind Kim Yuna.

Park made her senior international debut at the 2014 Four Continents Championships. She placed 8th in the short program and 9th in the free skating, finished 9th with the combined total of 162.71. She was selected to represent her country at the 2014 Winter Olympics with her national teammates, Kim Yuna and Kim Hae-jin. She was 23rd after the short program, barely advancing to the free skate. After the free skate, she placed 21st overall. At the 2014 World Championships, she had a clean free program and placed 9th overall. She scored 176.71 points, which was her new personal best.

2014–15 season: First national title
Park made her Grand Prix debut at the 2014 Skate America. She placed 5th in both programs and 5th overall. At the 2014 Rostelecom Cup, she placed 7th in the short program, 4th in the free skate and 5th overall.

At the 2015 South Korean Championships, Park won both the short program and free skate, and won her first national title. At the 2015 Four Continents she placed 10th in the short program, 9th in the free skate, and 9th overall.

At the 2015 World Championships, Park placed 15th in the short program, 9th in the free skate, and 12th overall. Her placement helped earn two spots for South Korea in the ladies event for the 2016 World Championships.

2015–16 season
Park received two 2015–16 Grand Prix assignments. She began her season by finishing 4th at 2015 Finlandia Trophy. Turning to the Grand Prix series, she placed 9th at 2015 Skate America and 8th at 2015 Cup of China.

Park then went on to finish 5th at the 2016 South Korean Championships, but was still named for the 2016 Four Continents and World teams since three of the four skaters that finished ahead of her were ineligible for the senior level. At Four Continents, she skated a personal best short program with a score of 62.49 points, placing in the top five in the short program and beating her season's best by 8.71 points. She went on to score 116.43 points in the free skate and a total score of 178.92 points placing fourth overall. Her total score was a personal best and beat her season's best by 14.64 points.

2016–17 season
Park placed 8th at the 2016 Skate America and then 5th at the 2016 Trophée de France. She fractured her left ankle during a training session on December 13, 2016, which caused her to withdraw from the 2017 South Korean Championships, 2017 Winter Universiade and the 2017 Asian Winter Games.

2017–18 season
Park had to undergo four surgeries while recovering from the ankle injury from the previous season. She participated in all three stages of the national selection process for the 2018 Winter Olympic Games, but could not get hold of a ticket.

2018–19 season
Park finished 4th at the 2019 South Korean Championships and 5th at the 2019 Winter Universiade. She participated in All That Skate 2019, then announced her retirement from competition. She is going to join the cast for a Cirque du Soleil show.

Skating technique

Park can land 3S-3T and 2A-3T combinations.

Programs

Competitive highlights

2011–12 to present 

GP: Grand Prix; CS: Challenger Series; JGP: Junior Grand Prix

2008–09 to 2010–11 : Pre-junior international debut

Detailed results

Senior level

Junior level 

At team events, medals awarded for team results only.

 ISU personal bests highlighted in bold.

References

 2012 Asian Figure Skating Trophy Results
 2011 Asian Figure Skating Trophy Results
 2011 International Children's Winter Games Results
 Detailed results and protocols at the New Zealand Ice Skating Association

External links 

 

South Korean female single skaters
1997 births
Living people
Sportspeople from South Jeolla Province
Figure skaters at the 2014 Winter Olympics
Olympic figure skaters of South Korea
Figure skaters at the 2012 Winter Youth Olympics
Competitors at the 2019 Winter Universiade
20th-century South Korean women
21st-century South Korean women